Cercanías Cádiz is the commuter rail service in the cities of Cádiz and Jerez de la Frontera in Andalucia, Spain. The service consists of two lines of 14 stations over 61 km of track, serving 2.8 million passengers a year.

History
Suburban trains began service in Cádiz in the 1980s. In 2000, work began to place the railway line leading into Cádiz underground to enable double-tracking and create a new linear park in the city. During this work, Cádiz railway station was temporarily closed with Cortadura serving as a terminus in the meantime. In 2002 the work was completed, with the reopening of Cádiz station and new underground stations San Severiano, Segunda Aguada and Estadio; spaced apart at a distance resembling a metro.

Route
The service mainly uses the Alcázar de San Juan–Cádiz main line, with a branch to the University of Cádiz from Las Aletas. The section of track between Cádiz railway station and Cortadura station was doubled and put underground in 2001, with the opening of new underground stations at San Severiano, Segunda Aguada and Estadio.

Stations

Of the thirteen stations on the network, the busiest in 2018 was Jerez de la Frontera with 592,000 passengers, followed by Cádiz and San Fernando (350,000 passengers each), El Puerto de Santa María (297,000), Bahía Sur (288,000) and Puerto Real (240,000).

Future development
The construction of the La Pepa Station in Jerez will start soon.

References

Rail transport in Spain